The Information Trust Institute (ITI) was founded in 2004 as an interdisciplinary unit designed to approach information security research from a systems perspective. It examines information security by looking at what makes machines, applications, and users trustworthy. Its mission is to create computer systems, software, and networks that society can depend on to be trustworthy, meaning secure, dependable (reliable and available), correct, safe, private, and survivable. ITI's stated goal is to create a new paradigm for designing trustworthy systems from the ground up and validating systems that are intended to be trustworthy.

Participants 
ITI is an academic/industry partnership focusing on application areas such as electric power, financial systems, defense, and homeland security, among others. It brings together over 100 researchers representing numerous colleges and units at the University of Illinois at Urbana–Champaign.

Major centers within ITI 
 Boeing Trusted Software Center
 CAESAR: the Center for Autonomous Engineering Systems and Robotics
 the Center for Information Forensics
 Center for Health Information Privacy and Security
 the NSA Center for Information Assurance Education and Research
 TCIPG: the Trustworthy Cyber Infrastructure for the Power Grid Center
 Trusted ILLIAC

References

https://www.wsj.com/articles/federal-researchers-simulate-power-grid-cyberattack-find-holes-in-response-plan-1541785202

https://interestingengineering.com/11-schools-with-the-best-cybersecurity-degrees-in-the-world

https://www.scientificamerican.com/article/tracking-cyber-hackers/

https://www.scientificamerican.com/article/fog-of-cyber-warfare/

https://blog.slate.fr/globule-et-telescope/2011/06/14/le-jour-ou-des-hackers-pirateront-le-reseau-electrique/

https://www.cioreview.com/news/quick-steps-to-trace-a-hacker-nid-18191-cid-9.html

https://www.newsindiatimes.com/indian-american-recognized-for-developing-method-to-locate-power-grid-attackers/

https://www.thewilkesbeacon.com/news/2018/09/20/profile-of-a-professor-dr-jane-blanken-webb-education/

External links 
 

Data security
University of Illinois Urbana-Champaign centers and institutes
2004 establishments in Illinois